Ernest Cossart (born Emil Gottfried von Holst, 24 September 1876 – 21 January 1951) was an English-American actor. After a stage career in England, he moved to the US, appearing on Broadway and all around the country. In the 1930s and 1940s, he appeared in films, specializing in playing butlers, valets, and similar roles, but playing a range of other parts.

Life and career
Cossart was born in Cheltenham, Gloucestershire, the younger of the two children of Adolph von Holst (1846–1901), a professional musician, and his first wife, Clara (née Lediard; 1841–1882).

The elder child, Gustavus, later known as Gustav Holst, became a leading English composer. Emil attended Cheltenham Grammar School and then became a clerk in a wine company's office. When he decided to pursue an acting career, he took the stage name Ernest Cossart, appearing on stage in Britain before moving to the US in 1908, working in Broadway productions and all over the country. During the First World War, he served in the Canadian Expeditionary Force and was severely wounded. After the war, he appeared in musical comedy in the West End before returning to Broadway in 1919.

In the late 1920s, Cossart made a return to the London stage, acting with Alfred Lunt and Lynn Fontanne in a West End transfer of a Broadway success, Caprice. In 1932, he appeared as Colonel Tallboys in the world premiere of Bernard Shaw's Too True to Be Good, with Beatrice Lillie and Leo G. Carroll.

Cossart moved into acting in Hollywood films in the 1930s. He was often typecast as butlers; The New York Times said of him:

In Angel, Cossart and Edward Everett Horton as the servants were judged to have had the best of the film. In addition to such roles, Cossart played a range of different characters, appearing as Pa Monaghan with Ronald Reagan in Kings Row, and as Squire Brown in Tom Brown's School Days. In two films, he played Roman Catholic priests, one French and the other Irish-American.

During the Second World War, Cossart was a co-founder, with Sir Cedric Hardwicke, Basil Rathbone, and other expatriate actors, of a fund to help artists in distress in Britain.

Cossart died in New York at the age of 74, survived by his wife, the actress Maude Davis, and their daughter, the actress Valerie Cossart (1907–1994).

Broadway roles

 Mary of Scotland (1933) as Lord Throgmorton

Partial filmography

The Strange Case of Mary Page (1916)
The Scoundrel (1935) – Jimmy Clay
Two for Tonight (1935) – Homps
The Great Ziegfeld (1936) – Sidney
Desire (1936) – Aristide Duvalle
Palm Springs (1936) – Starkey
Murder with Pictures (1936) – Stanley Redfield
Three Smart Girls (1936) – Binns
Champagne Waltz (1937) – Waiter
As Good as Married (1937) – Quinn
Angel (1937) – Wilton
Bringing Up Baby (1938) – Joe
Letter of Introduction (1938) – Andrews
Zaza (1938) – Marchand
Three Smart Girls Grow Up (1939) – Binns

Never Say Die (1939) – Jeepers
The Magnificent Fraud (1939) – Duval
Lady of the Tropics (1939) – Father Antoine
Tower of London (1939) – Tom Clink
The Light That Failed (1939) – Beeton
A Bill of Divorcement (1940) – Rev. Dr. Pumphrey 
Tom Brown's School Days (1940) – Squire Brown
Kitty Foyle (1940) – Thomas Foyle
Skylark (1941) – Theodore
Kings Row (1942) – Pop Monaghan 
Tonight and Every Night (1944) – Sam Royce
 The Girl of the Limberlost (1945)
Cluny Brown (1946) – Syrett
The Jolson Story (1946) – Father McGee
Angel Street (1950) – Manningham
Source: British Film Institute

References

External links

1876 births
1951 deaths
20th-century English male actors
Male actors from Gloucestershire
English people of German descent
English people of Latvian descent
English male film actors
People from Cheltenham
People educated at Dean Close School
British expatriate male actors in the United States
Canadian military personnel of World War I